The 1986 Junior League World Series took place from August 11–16 in Taylor, Michigan, United States. Waldorf, Maryland defeated Athens County, Ohio in the championship game.

This year featured the debut of the Mexico Region.

Teams

Results

References

Junior League World Series
Junior League World Series
Junior